The Mr. Peabody & Sherman Show is an animated streaming television series produced by DreamWorks Animation and Bullwinkle Studios. The series is based on the 1960s segments, called "Peabody's Improbable History", that aired as part of The Adventures of Rocky and Bullwinkle and Friends, and the 2014 film, Mr. Peabody & Sherman, which was also produced by DreamWorks Animation. The series premiered on October 9, 2015, on Netflix. The second season was released on March 18, 2016. The third season was released on October 21, 2016. The fourth season was released on April 21, 2017.

The series is digitally hand-drawn, with the Vancouver-based DHX Media providing the animation. Mr. Peabody is voiced by Chris Parnell, while Max Charles reprises his role as Sherman from the film. Originally, according to The Animation Guild, I.A.T.S.E. Local 839, 78 episodes of the television series have been ordered, but only 52 episodes were aired.

The series debuted in the United States on Universal Kids on April 8, 2018.

Synopsis
Mr. Peabody and his son Sherman host a live TV variety show out of their Manhattan penthouse, with various historical figures as their guests that are brought to them through the WABAC time machine. Half of the show is in a variety show format, with the other half being time travel adventures formatted like the original "Peabody's Improbable History" segments from the 1950s and 60s.

This show also introduces new characters like the robotic Orchoptitron, the building manager Mr. Hobson, the notary Mrs. Hughes, and Peabody's downstairs neighbors Christine Bluestone and the Yakamora family. The janitor Old Bill also appears where he is mostly seen during the credits.

Episodes

Voice cast

Main
 Chris Parnell as Hector J. Peabody
 Max Charles as Sherman
 Da'Vine Joy Randolph as Christine Bluestone, Abby Fisher
 Dieter Jansen as Mr. Calvert Hobson, Bird Baby
 Sunil Malhotra as Sweet Tune Swami
 David P. Smith as Mrs. Arugula Hughes, Orchoptitron, and Orville Wright
 Josh Keaton as Mr. Yakamora, Josh Guapo, Wilbur Wright, others
 Kari Wahlgren as Mrs. Yakamora, Maria Garcia, Annie Oakley, Joan of Arc, Queen Elizabeth I, Hatshepsut, Ada Lovelace, Lucy Walker, Pinkbeard (in "Blackbeard"), others

Special guest stars
 Brian Baumgartner as Hotu Matu'a
 Flula Borg as Joe Troplong
 Gary Busey as Alternate Future Mr. Peabody
 Margaret Cho as Hua Mulan
 Bob Dorough as James Madison
 Stephen Fry as Uncle Duke
 Jared Harris as Bigfoot
 Daniel Henney as Akashi Shiganosuke
 Jane Lynch as Bernadette Steel
 Missi Pyle as Catherine the Great (1st Time)
 Jeff Ross as Aristophanes
 Fred Stoller as Peter Cooper
 Reggie Watts as Rejgie

Guest stars
 Carlos Alazraqui as Ponce de Leon
 Dee Bradley Baker as Wolfgang Amadeus Mozart
 Eric Bauza as Galileo
 Michael Patrick Bell as Santa Claus
 Jeff Bennett as Abraham Lincoln, Mark Twain, Vladimir K. Zworykin, Joseph Lister, Saint Patrick, Roberto Ublindo
 Steve Blum as Jules Léotard, Edgar Allan Poe
 Flula Borg as Joe Troplong
 Eric Bradley as Julio Iglesias
 Grey DeLisle as Cleopatra
 Terry Dexter as Joan of Arc
 Richard Epcar as Julius Caesar
 Daniel Henney as Akashi Shiganosuke
 Danny Jacobs as Enrico Caruso
 Grace Kaufman as Boogaz
 Tom Kenny as Blackbeard, Nicolas-Joseph Cugnot, George Washington (in "David Bushnell")
 Andrew Kishino as Koikawa Harumachi
 Evan Kishiyama as Payton
 Abigail Zoe Lewis as Shelby
 Yuri Lowenthal as Baby Kenny
 Tress MacNeille as Florence Nightingale, Oracle
 Marsai Martin as Anissa
 Melanie Minichino as Queen Isabella
 Dave B. Mitchell as Frédéric Auguste Bartholdi
 Mark Moseley as King Agamemnon
 Daran Norris as Allan Pinkerton
 Nolan North as Marco Polo, John Sutter
 Farris Patton as Lady Godiva
 Rob Paulsen as Pirate
 Kevin Michael Richardson as Bumblebeard (in "Blackbeard")
 Paul Rugg as Napoleon
 Joshua Rush as Wheels
 Tara Strong as Catherine the Great (2nd time)
 Fred Tatasciore as José Guapo, Leif Erikson, John Sutter, David Bushnell, Robert Peary, Winston Churchill, Nostradamus
 Albert Tsai as Kid
 Michael-Leon Wooley as George Crum, Ziryab

Musical guests
In some episodes there is a musical guest.

 Wordsworth & Prince Paul in Stuck/Mozart
 Jukebox the Ghost in Black Hole/Winston Churchill
 Ra Ra Riot in Peabody's Parents/Galileo
 JD McPherson in Outbreak/Ancient Greek Games
 Katie Herzig in World Records/Hotu Matu'a
 JD Sampson in Telethon/Enrico Caruso
 Hammered Satin in Peabody's Delivery/Joe vs. the Peabody and Sherman
 The Family Crest in The Perfect Perfect Show Again Again/Abraham Lincoln

Production
Chris Parnell replaced Ty Burrell as the voice of Mr. Peabody from the 2014 film Mr. Peabody & Sherman. He auditioned for the role about a year and a half before the series' premiere. Trying to replicate Bill Scott's voice from the original cartoons as close as possible, he prepared by watching the 1960s show, and ended up doing his own interpretation of the character.

Soundtrack

A soundtrack for the first season of the series was released digitally on October 2, 2015, and was released on CD in December 2015. Published by Lakeshore Records, the album features original score and the opening theme song by Eric Goldman and Michael Corcoran (aka The Outfit), and new original songs by Jukebox the Ghost, JD McPherson, Wordsworth and Prince Paul, and Ra Ra Riot., along with original songs performed by the cast of the series.

Accolades

References

External links
  at DreamWorks TV
  at DHX Media
 

2015 American television series debuts
2017 American television series endings
2010s American animated television series
2010s American time travel television series
Annie Award winners
American flash animated television series
English-language Netflix original programming
American children's animated comedy television series
Television series by DreamWorks Animation
Television series by Universal Television
Television series by DHX Media
Animated television series reboots
The Adventures of Rocky and Bullwinkle and Friends
Animated television shows based on films
Animated television series about orphans
Animated television series about dogs
Animation based on real people
Television shows set in New York City
Netflix children's programming